= Frank Owusu (innovator) =

Ghanaian engineer and innovator

- Education: Kwame Nkrumah University of Science and Technology
- Occupations: Engineer, entrepreneur
- Known for: Founder of Aquamet
- Notable work: Aquamet smart water-quality monitoring system
- Awards: Runner-up, Royal Academy of Engineering’s Africa Prize for Engineering Innovation (2025)

Frank Owusu is a Ghanaian engineer, inventor and entrepreneur who is the founder of Aquamet, a smart water-quality monitoring system for fish farming. In 2025, he was named a runner-up in the Royal Academy of Engineering’s Africa Prize for Engineering Innovation, recognised as one of Africa's leading technology entrepreneurs.

== Career ==
Owusu developed the Aquamet system to assist smallholder fish farmers in improving production efficiency and sustainability. The technology provides real-time data on oxygen levels and temperature, for farmers to reduce losses and optimise yields. Beyond water monitoring, the Aquamet mobile platform offers digital tools for record-keeping, access to extension services, and a marketplace that connects farmers directly with buyers.

The idea for Aquamet originated during Owusu's national service at the Department of Fisheries and Watershed Management at Kwame Nkrumah University of Science and Technology (KNUST), where he observed that many farmers relied on intuition rather than data to manage ponds. His work aims to address the widespread problem of fish mortality linked to poor water quality in Ghana, where fish serves as the primary protein source for about 70% of the population.

Under Owusu's leadership, Aquamet plans to expand to Nigeria and Ivory Coast within five years, with a target of reaching more than 20,000 fish farmers. The company's long-term vision is to enhance food security and promote sustainable aquaculture practices across West Africa.

== Recognition ==
In October 2025, Owusu was selected as one of three runners-up in the Africa Prize for Engineering Innovation, earning £10,000 in prize funding. His recognition highlighted the role of African innovators in developing homegrown technological solutions for agriculture and food security. The 2025 edition of the prize was held in Dakar, Senegal, marking the first time the final event took place in Francophone Africa.
